Las Amantes del Señor de la Noche (The Lovers of the Lord of the Night) is a 1986 Mexican horror film.

Synopsis  
Venusita (Elena de Haro) falls in love with the son of a wealthy family whose mother sends her son off to the United States in order to keep the two apart. Not to be rejected so easily, Venusita visits Saurina (Irma Serrano) the sorceress who comes up with a spell that kills off the merchant and zaps the son back home, but Venusita's problems are far from over.

Cast 
 Isela Vega... Nana Amparo
 Irma Serrano... Saurina
 Elena de Haro...Venusita
 Emilio Fernández... Don Venustiano
 Lilia Prado... Celina
 Arturo Vázquez... Pedro
 Andres García... Amparo's Lover

Production Notes
The movie is about witchcraft and a passion thriller around it. It was written by a very known Mexican writer Hugo Argüelles in conjunction with Isela Vega. Great actors appear in the movie including Emilio Fernández and the always enigmatic Irma Serrano who is already celebrity of its own. This film passed unnoticed in Mexico in part thanks to the lousy distribution system of that time, which used to privilege the foreign movies. Nowadays there are no longer Mexican movies so the distributors no longer have the concern of programming Mexican movies. The movie could have turned into a cult movie. It has a good plot, good intentions, interesting actors and low budget.

External links 
 

1986 films
1980s Spanish-language films
1980s supernatural horror films
Religious horror films
Mexican supernatural horror films
1980s Mexican films